Pholidotamorpha ("pangolin-shaped") is a clade of mammals that includes the orders Palaeanodonta and Pholidota (the pangolins).

In the past both orders were formerly classified with various other orders of ant-eating mammals, most notably Xenarthra, which includes the true anteaters, sloths, and the armadillos which pangolins superficially resemble. Newer genetic evidence, however, indicates their closest living relatives are the Carnivora with which they form the clade Ferae. Some palaeontologists, placing family Ernanodontidae in a separate suborder Ernanodonta of Cimolesta near Pholidota, have classified the pangolins in the order Cimolesta, together with several extinct groups indicated (†) below, though this idea has fallen out of favor since it was determined that cimolestids were not placental mammals. A 2012 study from new remains found in Late Paleocene Mongolian strata have led to the assessment that Ernanodon is closely related to Metacheiromys within the order Palaeanodonta, which, in the study, was reaffirmed to be the sister taxon of Pholidota.

Classification and phylogeny

Classification 
 Clade: Pholidotamorpha
 Order: Pholidota (pangolins)
 Genus: †Euromanis
 Family: †Eurotamanduidae
 Suborder: Eupholidota (true pangolins)
 Order: †Palaeanodonta (stem-pangolins)
 Family: †Epoicotheriidae
 Family: †Ernanodontidae
 Family: †Escavadodontidae
 Family: †Metacheiromyidae (paraphyletic family)
 Incertae sedis:
 Genus: †Amelotabes
 Genus: †Arcticanodon
 Genus: †Melaniella

Phylogeny 
The phylogenetic relationships of clade Pholidotamorpha are shown in the following cladogram:

References

 
Paleocene first appearances